Peter Matthew Wright (born December 3, 1972) is an American former competition swimmer who represented the United States at the 1996 Summer Olympics in Atlanta, Georgia.  Wright competed in the preliminary heats of the men's 1,500-meter freestyle, and finished twelfth overall with a time of 15:25.43.

Wright has been a resident of Delran Township, New Jersey.

References

1972 births
Living people
American male freestyle swimmers
Olympic swimmers of the United States
People from Delran Township, New Jersey
Swimmers at the 1996 Summer Olympics
Virginia Cavaliers men's swimmers
Universiade medalists in swimming
Universiade silver medalists for the United States
Medalists at the 1991 Summer Universiade